The Fox Lake Correctional Institution is a medium-security state prison for men located in Fox Lake, Dodge County, Wisconsin, owned and operated by the Wisconsin Department of Corrections.  

In 2008 the facility has a rated capacity of 691 inmates and an actual population of 1,033.  The facility first opened in September 1962.

References

Prisons in Wisconsin
Buildings and structures in Dodge County, Wisconsin
1962 establishments in Wisconsin